Halvorson is a surname. Notable people with the surname include:

David Halvorson (1948–2013), American politician
Debbie Halvorson (born 1958), Illinois politician
Gary Halvorson, American television and film director
George Halvorson (born 1947), American healthcare executive
Halvor L. Halvorson (1881–1951), North Dakota politician 
Halvor O. Halvorson (1897–1975), American microbiologist
Harlyn O. Halvorson (1925–2008), American microbiologist
Henry Theodore Halvorson (1883–1943), American lumber salesman and political figure 
Josephine Halvorson, (born 1981), American artist
Kittel Halvorson (1846–1936), U.S. Representative from Minnesota
Kristina Halvorson (born 1971), American author and speaker known for her expertise in website content strategy
Mary Halvorson (born 1980), American jazz musician
Melissa Halvorson Wiklund (born 1962), Minnesota politician and member of the Minnesota Senate
Rodney Halvorson (born 1949), Iowa state legislator and political activist 
Roger Halvorson (1934–2014), American politician

See also
Halvorsen

Patronymic surnames